Legionella londiniensis is a Gram-negative bacterium from the genus Legionella which was isolated from hot spring water in Shizuoka in Japan.

References

External links
Type strain of Legionella londiniensis at BacDive -  the Bacterial Diversity Metadatabase

Legionellales
Bacteria described in 1993